Fieldville is a historical unincorporated community located within Piscataway Township in Middlesex County, New Jersey, United States. The location is sometimes described as being on River Road south of Bound Brook. The community was named after John Field and his descendants who settled the area.

History
John Field (1659–1729) purchased  along the Raritan River in 1695 from Benjamin Clarke.

Historic houses
The original Field House, built by John Field in 1710, was located between River Road and the Raritan River. It was destroyed in 1907.

Richard R. Field (1755–1840) lived in a frame house at 260 River Road, dated  by a foundation stone.

John Field's grandson, John Field (born 1714), built a stone house at 625 River Road in 1743. A later addition was wood-frame construction.

About 1868, Benjamin McDowell Field built a large two-story frame house along River Road. It was also known as the Kenneth Perry House, named after its last owner. The house was destroyed by fire in 1965.

Fieldville Dam
As part of the Delaware and Raritan Canal, a dam was constructed on the Raritan River at Fieldville to supply water for the last five miles of the canal to New Brunswick. What remains of the dam can still be seen in the Raritan River, about 500 feet upstream from the I-287 North overpass near exit 10.

Transportation
Fieldville is accessed by two major roads: Interstate 287 and County Route 622 (River Road).

See also
Road Up Raritan Historic District

References

Bibliography

External links

Piscataway, New Jersey
Unincorporated communities in Middlesex County, New Jersey
Unincorporated communities in New Jersey
1710 establishments in New Jersey